Fred Mfuranzima (born 1997) is a Rwandan writer and peace activist.

Mfuranzima is a CEO and a founder of Imfura Heritage Rwanda, a social enterprise whose focus is in arts and culture education, and book publication with a goal of advocating for sustainable peace and positive change. He has written various both in English and Kinyarwanda books that include: Child; Rwanda is poetry, The broken, Kuva ku gasozi Bututsi, Dreams to find another World, and A sister's left shoe,.

Mfuranzima has also written poems such as “My Shame”, “Never Again”, “Endless Music”, “In low Voice”, “Confession”, “Three Patriots”, “Umwiza”, “Full of Respect”, “African Dreamer

Early life and education 
Mfuranzima was born in the southern part of Rwanda in 1997, but he grew up in the slums of Kigali from a family of people who had survived the genocide. The background of his family later sparked passion in him,that led him into playing a role in peace building and reconciliation using poetry, writing and arts.

In 2016, he completed his Advanced level education studies at Lycée de Rusatira, in a history, economics and geography (HEG) combination.

See also
 List of peace activists

References 

1997 births
Living people
Rwandan poets
Rwandan writers